The Central District of Qasr-e Shirin County is a district (bakhsh) in Qasr-e Shirin County, Kermanshah Province, Iran. At the 2006 census, its population was 19,574, in 4,920 families.  The District has one city: Qasr-e Shirin. The District has three rural districts (dehestan): Alvand Rural District, Fathabad Rural District, and Nasrabad Rural District.

References 

Qasr-e Shirin County
Districts of Kermanshah Province